Aaron Michael Sidwell (born 12 September 1988) is an English actor and singer. He is known for portraying the role of Steven Beale on the BBC soap opera EastEnders, originating the role of Michael Dork in Loserville in the West End and fronting his own pop group, The Boston Plan. He was also the first British actor to play "Johnny" in Green Day's musical, American Idiot.

Career
Sidwell was born in 1988 in Maidstone, Kent and grew up in the village of Kingswood, Kent. He was given a drama scholarship when he was eleven years old at Bethany School. He started his acting career on stage and was a member of All Saints Choir. He worked for several years on the stage. Shortly after leaving, his big break came when he was cast as Steven Beale in the BBC soap opera, EastEnders; he took over the role from Edward Savage, who last appeared in 2002. Sidwell left the role in 2008.

At the end of April 2010, Sidwell started working on an online show called Almost, But Not Quite, playing the part of Josh Newell. In August 2011, he starred in a new musical called The Prodigals alongside X Factors Lucie Jones, which made its debut at the Edinburgh Fringe Festival. In 2012, Sidwell made his West End debut in Children of Eden at the Prince of Wales theatre, starring alongside Gareth Gates and Kerry Ellis. Sidwell took the part of Ham in Stephen Schwartz's musical. In June 2012, Sidwell headed up the cast of the brand new production Loserville: The Musical, playing Michael Dork at the West Yorkshire Playhouse, alongside Gates, Lil' Chris and Eliza Bennett. Loserville was then transferred to the West End's Garrick Theatre from October. Loserville: The Musical closed in January 2013. Sidwell received critical acclaim for his portrayal of Michael Dork, and the show was viewed as a cult hit. Sidwell posted on his Twitter account about the show saying, "This show has changed my life in more ways than you will ever know. I am proud to say that I was part of something special." Sidwell then returned to EastEnders in 2016, after an eight-year break from the soap. However, in August 2017, he announced his decision to leave the soap again. In May 2021, he appeared in an episode of the BBC soap opera Doctors as Joel Cooke. 

In 2022, he made his debut with the Royal Shakespeare Company appearing in their productions of Henry VI Rebellion and War of the Roses. He played Jack Cade in both plays and "The Son" as well in War of the Roses.

Stage

Filmography

References

External links

 

English male soap opera actors
1988 births
People from Maidstone
Living people
Male actors from Kent
People educated at Bethany School, Goudhurst